Muth's Park was a baseball park located in San Antonio, Texas, United States. The park, located near Fort Sam Houston, was the first host for professional baseball in the city.

It was the home of the Texas League San Antonio Missionaries in 1888.

References

Baseball venues in San Antonio
Defunct baseball venues in the United States
Defunct minor league baseball venues
Baseball venues in Texas